Philip Boedoro (born 21 May 1958) is a Vanuatuan politician.

He was first elected to the parliament of Vanuatu in 2002 as a representative of Maewo. He returned to the legislature in 2008, and was reelected in 2012. From April 2013 to June 2015, Boedoro served as speaker of the Parliament of Vanuatu. He was acting president of Vanuatu in September 2014. In his capacity as speaker, Boedoro dismissed sixteen parliamentarians, all of whom filed a lawsuit against him. Boedoro's appeal of the case was dismissed in May 2015.

References

1958 births
Living people
Presidents of Vanuatu
Speakers of the Parliament of Vanuatu
Vanua'aku Pati politicians
Members of the Parliament of Vanuatu